Martin Hamann (born 10 April 1997) is a German ski jumper.

He participated at the large hill event at the FIS Nordic World Ski Championships 2021.

FIS World Nordic Ski Championships results

References

External links

1997 births
Living people
German male ski jumpers